The frontal crest of the frontal bone ends below in a small notch which is converted into a foramen, the foramen cecum (or foramen caecum), by articulation with the ethmoid.

The foramen cecum varies in size in different subjects, and is frequently impervious; when open, it transmits the emissary vein from the nose to the superior sagittal sinus. This has clinical importance in that infections of the nose and nearby areas can be transmitted to the meninges and brain from what is known as the danger triangle of the face.

Additional images

See also
 Foramina of skull

References

External links
  look for #2
 

Foramina of the skull